The Vaalserberg is a hill with a height of  above NAP and is the highest point in the European part of the Netherlands. The Vaalserberg is located in the province of Limburg, at the south-easternmost edge of the country, near the town of Vaals (after which it is named).

Mount Scenery on the island of Saba, which is in the Caribbean part of the Netherlands, replaced Vaalserberg as the highest point in the Netherlands, following the dissolution of the Netherlands Antilles in 2010.

Three-country point

The Vaalserberg is also the location of the tripoint between Germany, Belgium and the Netherlands and so its summit is called the Drielandenpunt ("three country point") in Dutch, Dreiländereck ("three country corner") in German and Trois Frontières ("three borders") in French.

On the Belgian side, the tripoint borders the region of Wallonia, including both the regular French-speaking area and the smaller German-speaking area. The German side falls within the city limits of Aachen in the state of North Rhine-Westphalia. Between 1830 and 1919, the summit was a quadripoint, also bordering Neutral Moresnet, which is now part of Belgium's German-speaking area.

The current Belgian-German border is not the same as the former eastern border of Moresnet with Prussia but is a little more to the east. Therefore, five different borders came together at this point but never more than four at one time, except possibly between 1917 and 1920, when the border situation was unclear and disputed.

The border intersection has made the Vaalserberg a well-known tourist attraction in the Netherlands, with a  tower on the Belgian side, opened in 1994 to replace the previous  tower, built in 1970. It offers a grand panorama of the surrounding landscape.

 south of the point, a railway crosses the German-Belgian border in the Gemmenicher Tunnel. It is the freight-only railway between Tongeren and Aachen.

Four-borders road
The road leading up to this point on the Dutch side is called the Viergrenzenweg ("four borders way"), probably because of the former territory of Neutral Moresnet.The names of the roads in Belgium (Route des Trois Bornes) and Germany (Dreiländerweg) refer to only three.

Along the road on the Dutch side is the  Wilhelminatoren observation tower, with a restaurant and forest trails. The present tower officially opened on 7 October 2011 and features a lift and a glass floor. The first tower at the site was built in 1905 during the reign of its namesake, Queen Wilhelmina of the Netherlands, and was demolished in 1945. The second  tower opened on 11 August 1951 and was demolished over the winter of 2010–2011 because of its poor condition and high maintenance requirements.

Road cycling
The Vaalserberg is often used in the Amstel Gold Race and is climbed halfway through the race. The climb is named in the roadbook of the Gold Race as Drielandenpunt and is followed by the Gemmenich climb.

See also
 List of mountains and hills in North Rhine-Westphalia

References

'Tim Travel': ''Holland's highest mountain (& the strange story of Neutral-Moresnet) (YouTube)

Highest points of countries
Border tripoints
Belgium–Germany border crossings
Belgium–Netherlands border crossings
Germany–Netherlands border crossings
Mountains and hills of the Ardennes (Belgium)
Mountains and hills of the Eifel
Mountains and hills of the Netherlands
Mountains and hills of Liège Province
Mountains and hills of North Rhine-Westphalia
Hills of South Limburg (Netherlands)
German-speaking Community of Belgium
Aachen
Kelmis
Vaals
Quadripoints and higher